Reed Green (September 22, 1865–January 2, 1937) was a lawyer and politician.

Reed was born in Mount Vernon, Illinois. He went to Southern Illinois University and to the Wesleyan Law School in Bloomington, Illinois. He taught school in Cairo, Illinois. He was admitted to the Illinois bar and practiced law in Cairo, Illinois. Green served in the Illinois House of Representatives from 1889 to 1893 and in the Illinois Senate from 1893 to 1897. He was a Democrat. Green died from a heart attack in Cairo, Illinois.

Notes

External links

1865 births
1937 deaths
People from Cairo, Illinois
People from Mount Vernon, Illinois
Illinois Wesleyan University alumni
Southern Illinois University alumni
Illinois lawyers
Democratic Party members of the Illinois House of Representatives
Democratic Party Illinois state senators